Fritz Weidner (1863–1950) was an important designer and builder in Bromberg (Bydgoszcz, Poland). A vast majority of his works is associated with the city. He is one among many architects and builders who gave a characteristic shape to the town at the turn of the 19th and 20th centuries, dominated by eclectic buildings with various styles, including Art Nouveau or Modernism.

Life
Ernst Friedrich Wilhelm "Fritz" Weidner was born on March 13, 1863, in Vordamm (today part of Drezdenko, Poland). His father Julius, from Bielefeld, was the head of the railway station. His mother Antoni Marie Augusta née Herold was the daughter of Friedrich Herold, a local masonry master, also mayor of Driesen (Drezdenko). The young Fritz spent his childhood and early youth in a family home. He graduated from the local public school and later obtained the builder qualification by passing the masonry exam. He soon got the rights to work as a manager.

At the beginning of the 1880s, he moved to Berlin and lived there with his brother Ernst, also a construction technician. According to family letters, he had been studying architecture and painting at the Berlin Academy of Arts for several semesters. This reduced academic education was not enough to obtain the title of architect, therefore, Fritz Weidner presumably followed courses in other universities of the German capital. During these sessions, he met his future wife, Alice Goodson, an Englishwoman.

Alice was the daughter of Thomas Goodson and Emma (née Wats). Thomas, London-born citizen, had been working in Berlin since 1859, as a city sanitary engineer. Alice was born in Berlin on May 20, 1867. Later he founded the company Thomas Goodson-Tiefbaufirma, offering engineering services in the field of underground constructions and plumbing installations. Fritz Weidner was rapidly employed at the Goodson company and there he took his first steps as a building designer.

Working in Bromberg
In 1895, he arrived alone in Bromberg, where he worked as a manager of the local branch of the Goodson company which contract was to supervise the construction of city sewerage network. Three years later, thanks to the thriving economic situation in Bromberg offering a profusion of career opportunities, he decided to settle in the city.

He brought his family and set up his own architecture office, while keeping his cooperation with his father-in-law. He was particularly active from 1896 to 1914. His studio took part in 90 investments: 25 were projects for new front houses, while the other works were related to rebuilding residential houses or erecting smaller constructions such as utility rooms (stables, garages, warehouses), fencing and parking lots. Most of the realizations were commissioned by private investors, mainly city rentiers, manufacturers, merchants or artisans.

His works are mainly concentrated in:
 Gdańska Street (9 edifices);
 Cieszkowskiego Street;
 Śniadeckich Street;
 Dworcowa Street;
 20 January 1920 Street.

Three buildings were the result of housing cooperative funding. They are located at 13/14, Cieszkowskiego Street, 3/5 Staszica Street and 1 Kołłątaja street. The latter was awarded as the most beautiful new building in 1912, in a competition organized by city authorities (together with Rudolf Kern's house at 20 January 1920 Street).

Weidner was at the origin of the first building in Bydgoszcz using reinforced concrete: designed by Berlin architect Otto Walther, it stands today at 15 Gdańska Street. 
His work also includes two large edifices in downtown district: the Mix Ernst tenement at 10 Gdańska Street and the Brandt Department Store at 4 Theatre square, today the local seat of Bank Pekao.

Fritz Weidner, at the beginning of the 20th century, turned to Landhaus style, evoking German mansions. He directed the creation of an ensemble of single-family houses in Bielawy, a suburban commune of Bydgoszcz. He also became involved in applying the Garden city movement to Bydgoszcz urban planning.

Numerous deficiencies, such as building out of the limits, starting construction works without the reception of the raw building framework, not sticking to the initial blueprint, caused the city representatives in charge of construction policy to submit in December 1910, a request to the mayor to deprive Weidner of his professional rights to practice. However, archived records on the case do not make it clear whether the threat was considered positively;  the architect was probably only admonished and a more intensified control of his work was applied.

Other activities

In addition to his professional activity, Fritz Weidner had a passion for journalism, especially to share new trends in art and architecture. In that sense, he was considered in Bromberg by his distinguished ambition to give a meaning to his artistic mission. He put a lot of effort into studying and disseminating knowledge about the latest trends in architecture and fine arts.
His time witnessed a period of great changes in European architecture, in particular in the German Empire. These changes were the portents of a radical shift between traditional style and new ones, i.e. Art Nouveau and early modernism. Weidner, knowledgeable of these significant changes, clearly followed new artistic grounds.

He expressed his views in articles published in the journal Technische Blätter für den Deutschen Osten published by the Society of Technicians created in 1857, subsumed into the German Society of Arts and Sciences in Bromberg. This association focused mostly on local construction entrepreneurs, architects, industrialists, engineering staff and craftsmen from various industries. Among his several writings (more than ten from 1903 to 1911), he wrote about Style, stylish, no style - from classic style to Secession, Böcklin and his art or Modern trends in painting and sculpture, their tasks and aims.

Weidner was an active member of the union's trade board, where he regularly gave lectures and readings about technical problems related to building design (e.g. lighting, water and sewage networks) or issues related to the theory of art and the concept of new artistic trends. 
From 1903 to 1906, he was the vice-chairman of this board. In 1907 he participated in publishing a book, Industry and Commerce in Bromberg to celebrate the 50th anniversary of the Society of Technicians.

Style
Fritz Weidner's artistic style has evolved from Eclecticism to Art Nouveau, through three stages.

When he arrived in Bromberg, his works were characterized by eclectic forms, with many Neo-Baroque decorative elements.

The second step of his stylistic maturation begun in 1897, with noticeable move towards Historicism where one can perceive a freedom of the planning, a lack of facade symmetry, as well as an abandonment of the stucco decoration, in favor of a decorative arrangement of different architectural elements (e.g. window shapes, loggias topped with arcades, bay windows, balconies).

Finally, in 1901, Weidner's work entered an Art Nouveau architectural phase, where he multiplied the use of various decorative motifs, playing with asymmetry on the frontages of his projects. Weidner's features related to  Art Nouveau  are mainly referring to the Viennese and German Secession, with a restrained, geometric approach, using organic motifs to a little extent, unlike what one can find in western countries Art Nouveau edifices.

He wrote in one of his articles: 
"A style is never used, it stood up and did not arise from the momentary mood of the artist or even a larger group of artists, but always develops logically, each time from specific temporal-spatial relations, each time as a result from the way of life of certain people, from the technical possibilities and material. That's why styles too need to change and develop further as people's lives (...)"

Quotation an other article:
"There is nothing in art that is right or wrong. The truth is only and only on the conviction of artist's feelings, artist's approach. Art is no knowledge. The artist creates freely, by himself, with his sensation, his fantasy. If he creates according to established rules (...), he ceases to be an artist, he becomes a craftsman (...)"

Eventually, after 1905, he developed some liking for modernism, where stucco and basic decorative elements were reduced to a minimum on a facade.

Fritz Weidner was appreciated as an architect having a vision and the aesthetic values of his buildings are still appreciated today.

Life after 1914
After the outbreak of World War I, Fritz Weidner volunteered for military service. Due to his age, he was not admitted to active service and was sent to the Reichsmarine, serving as an architect: he was stationed in Flanders to rebuild war damaged buildings on the coast. He then moved to Lyck (Ełk) and Lötzen (Giżycko), which suffered heavy destruction during the war in East Prussia.

In 1920, he returned to Bromberg, decided to live in the city despite the exodus of the German population, linked to the return of Bydgoszcz to the Second Polish Republic. Albeit his positive expectations, the unstable economic situation combined with the outflow of German capital was not favourable for city construction investments.

In 1937, he left Bydgoszcz with his wife and settled in Hamburg. Initially, they lived with their older son Hans, but moved in 1939 to their own flat. During World War II, Fritz and Alice moved to their daughter's house, Margarete Bublitz, in Wysoka, near Schneidemühl (Piła). Thanks to this, they avoided the tragic fate of many inhabitants during the allied air raids on July 24–30, 1943, when their Hamburg apartment was flattened.

In January 1945, Fritz and his wife escaped from the approaching soviet army invading eastern Germany. They travelled by harsh winter days (-18 °C), from Dramburg (Drawsko Pomorskie) to Potsdam, where they survived a last great air raid. In Potsdam, on September 25, 1950, the couple celebrated their diamond wedding anniversary. Fritz Weidner died on October 10, 1950 and was buried in Teltow district cemetery.

Personal life
Fritz Weidner married on September 25, 1890, Englishwoman Alice Jessie Goodson.

They had five children: Charlotte, Erna, Hans, Margarete and Walter. In Bromberg, the family lived at 73 Dworcowa Street, in the flat which initially belonged to Friedrich Herold, grandfather of Fritz Weidner. Alice Weidner died on December 2, 1957, in Lengerich, Westphalia.

Works in Bromberg

See also

 Bydgoszcz
 Bydgoszcz Architects (1850-1970s)
 List of Polish people

References

Bibliography
 
 
 
  Iwona Jastrzębska-Puzowska (Bydgoszcz/Bromberg) - Der Bromberger Architekt Fritz Weidner – Kunstauffassung und Werk

1863 births
1950 deaths
19th-century German architects
20th-century German architects
20th-century Polish architects
Architects from Bydgoszcz
People from Drezdenko
People from the Province of Brandenburg